Electrical Storm is the debut solo album by Australian guitarist and songwriter Ed Kuepper featuring Nick Fisher and Louis Tillett recorded in 1985 and released on the Hot label. The album was Kuepper's first release following the breakup of Laughing Clowns, the band he formed after leaving The Saints.

Kuepper later explained, "I sort of retired. It was at that point Jude and I got married, and went away for a honeymoon on the fabulous Gold Coast. I took a guitar and wrote a lot of songs. And that was Electrical Storm basically. I did it for the princely sum of $1200."

Track listing
All compositions by Ed Kuepper
 "Car Headlights" – 2:44
 "No More Sentimental Jokes" – 2:23
 "Master of Two Servants" – 3:06
 "A Trick or Two" – 3:07
 "When the Sweet Turns Sour" – 2:51
 "Another Story" – 2:56
 "Electrical Storm" – 4:16
 "Told Myself" – 4:00
 "One Small Town" – 1:58
 "Palace of Sin" – 3:29
 "Rainy Night" – 1:55
Recorded in 1985 at Sound Barrier Studios, Camperdown, Sydney.

Personnel
Ed Kuepper – vocals, electric guitar, acoustic guitar, bass guitar, mandolin
Nick Fisher – drums
Louis Tillett – piano
Technical
Dave Boyne - engineer
Jon Watkins - artwork

References

Hot Records albums
Ed Kuepper albums
1985 debut albums